Cape Norman is a settlement in Newfoundland and Labrador. It is the northernmost village on the island of Newfoundland. It is situated slightly inland of Cape Norman Bay.

Populated places in Newfoundland and Labrador